Lajos Ernő Batthyány (17 March 1696 - 26 October 1765) was a Hungarian noble, Court Chancellor and Palatine of Hungary.

Life 
Lajos Batthyány was the eldest son of Adam II. Batthyány (1662-1703) and Eleonore Batthyány-Strattmann. Károly József Batthyány was his only brother. Like his father and brother, he first pursued a military career by joining the Habsburg Army.

Initially known as a captain, Batthyány fought in 1716 at the Battle of Peterwardein and at the Siege of Temesvár under the command of Prince Eugene. He then switched to the civil service.
In 1737 he became the Hungarian Court Chancellor in Vienna. As such, he took part in the Diet in Pressburg in 1741 and supported Empress Maria Theresa in a memorable speech. He was Chief Cupbearer, privy councilor and from 1744 a Knight of the Golden Fleece (No 712). In 1751 he became the last Palatine of Hungary until his death. In 1756 he raised a regiment of hussars that fought in the Seven Years' War. He chose Bicske Castle as his administrative and head office and extensively remodeled it.

In his final years, he fell out of favour on the question of the treatment of the serfs by the Hungarian nobility. Frequent peasant riots and complaints of forced labour and harsh treatment on Batthyány's domains decided Maria Theresa to investigate the matter herself. The sovereign named Lajos Batthyány as one of “the most hardened oppressors”. The investigation led to a number of reforms aimed at improving peasant conditions in Hungary most notably the land registry patent of 1767.

Personal life 
On 27 May 1717 he married in Vienna Countess Therese Kinsky (1700–1775), daughter of Wenceslaus Norbert, Count of Kinsky.They had 5 sons and 4 daughters. Lajos Batthyány died in 1765 and was buried in the family crypt of Güssing Castle.

References

Sources 
 Biography (in German)
 Güssing Castle Crypt

Hungarian nobility
1696 births
1765 deaths
Palatines of Hungary
Knights of the Golden Fleece of Austria
Austro-Turkish War (1716–1718)